Clube Desportivo das Aves, commonly known as Desportivo das Aves, or simply as Aves, is a Portuguese professional football club based in Vila das Aves, Santo Tirso. The club was founded on 12 November 1930 and plays at the Estádio do Clube Desportivo das Aves, which holds a seating capacity of 8,560.

As a sports club, it has football schools for junior players and two futsal teams for both men and women, as well as a football trial system to help younger players come through the academy. The club's official supporters' group are the Força Avense.

History

Aves have spent most of their history in the lower leagues, having their debut Primeira Liga season in 1985–86 after winning consecutively the second and third divisions. They returned to the top flight for 2000–01 and 2006–07, again for one season each.

Aves won promotion from LigaPro in 2016–17, finishing as runners-up to Portimonense S.C. under the management of José Mota. On 20 May 2018, the club defeated Sporting CP 2–1 and won their first Taça de Portugal. However, Aves did not qualify for the 2018–19 UEFA Europa League group stage because they failed to obtain a license for European competitions. The team were relegated in 2019–20, with five games to play, were marred by financial problems. For these reasons, they and Vitória F.C. were given a further relegation to the third tier.

On 23 September 2020, Aves withdrew before the start of the season. Due to unpaid debts to other clubs, the club received a transfer ban from FIFA, which it sidestepped by founding new entity Clube Desportivo das Aves 1930 in October.

Stadium
Desportivo das Aves play at the Estádio do Clube Desportivo das Aves in Vila das Aves, Santo Tirso, holding a seating capacity of 8,560. The stadium also plays host to the reserve side's home games. It was inaugurated on 8 December 1981.

It underwent many renovations during the new millennium. Especially in 2000, when Desportivo das Aves gained promotion to the Primeira Liga for the second time in their history. When the stadium was built, there were 12,500 seats available, but it currently seats only 8,560 after the club decided to remove chairs.

Honours
 Taça de Portugal: 1
2017–18
 Segunda Divisão: 1
1984–85
 Terceira Divisão: 1
1983–84

Players

Current squad

Managerial history

  Henrique Nunes (1992–1994)
  Manuel Barbosa (1994–1995)
  Eduardo Luís (1995–1996)
  Luís Campos (1996–1998)
  António Frasco (1998)
  Professor Neca (1998–2000)
  Carlos Carvalhal (2000–2001)
  Luís Agostinho (2001–2002)
  António Caetano (2002–2003)
  Carlos Garcia (June, 2003–29 Oct 2003)
  José Gomes (29 Oct 2003 – 9 May 2004)
  Manuel Correia (June, 2004–11 Jan 2005)
  Professor Neca (11 Jan 2005 – 20 May 2007)
  José Gomes (25 May 2007 – 5 Dec 2007)
  Henrique Nunes (5 Dec 2007 – 24 May 2009)
  Micael Sequeira (6 June 2009 – 6 Oct 2010)
  Vítor Oliveira (7 Oct 2010 – 29 May 2011)
  Paulo Fonseca (7 June 2011 – 28 May 2012)
  José Vilaça (22 June 2012 – 18 Feb 2013)
  Professor Neca (18 Feb 2013 – 18 May 2013)
  Fernando Valente (28 June 2014 – 6 January 2015)
  Emanuel Simões (6 January 2015 – 9 July 2015)
  Abel Xavier (9 July 2015 – 4 September 2015)
  Ulisses Morais (5 September 2015 – 17 May 2016)
  Ivo Vieira (26 May 2016 – 15 February 2017)
  José Mota (18 February 2017 – 22 May 2017)
  Ricardo Soares (27 May 2017–)

League and cup history

Last updated: 27 Aug 2018
Div. = Division; 1D = Portuguese League; 2H = Liga de Honra; 2DS = Portuguese Second Division; 2LP = Portuguese Segunda Liga
Pos. = Position; Pl = Match played; W = Win; D = Draw; L = Lost; GS = Goal scored; GA = Goal against; P = Points

Futsal

Desportivo das Aves has a futsal team that has played top tier futsal in the Liga Sport Zone.

References

External links
 Official Website 
 C.D. Aves at Football-lineups.com
 Club Profile at ForaDeJogo 
 Club Profile at LPFP 
 Club profile & squad at ZeroZero 

 
Association football clubs established in 1930
1930 establishments in Portugal
Primeira Liga clubs
Liga Portugal 2 clubs
Taça de Portugal winners
Football clubs in Portugal